John Hempleman  (April 22, 1933 - August 19, 2019) was a former Grand Prix motorcycle road racer from New Zealand. He had his best season in 1960 when he won the 250 and 500 classes at the East German Grand Prix, a non-championship race, and finished the year in fifth place in the 125cc world championship.

References 

New Zealand motorcycle racers
125cc World Championship riders
250cc World Championship riders
350cc World Championship riders
500cc World Championship riders
Isle of Man TT riders
Place of birth missing
1933 births
2019 deaths